Elizabeth Russell (August 2, 1916 – May 4, 2002) was an American actress. Born in Philadelphia, Pennsylvania, she was best known for her roles in several of producer Val Lewton's low-budget horror films produced at RKO Pictures in the mid-1940s. She was the sister-in-law of Rosalind Russell.

Career

Russell worked as a photographer's model in New York City before she became an actress. When she was chosen for a part in Cat People (1942), Russell was a model who acted part-time. In his book Fearing the Dark: The Val Lewton Career, Edmund G. Bansak wrote, "Although lasting only moments, the economy of Russell's cameo is wondrous and it remains etched in viewers' memories long after the more essential concerns of plot and character have been all but forgotten."

Personal life
Russell married advertising man John Russell in 1937, they had a young son. In 1942, she was already divorced.

Partial filmography

 Forgotten Faces (1936) - Girl
 Girl of the Ozarks (1936) - Gail Rogers
 My American Wife (1936) - Miss Van Dusen (uncredited)
 Lady Be Careful (1936) - Dancer (uncredited)
 Hideaway Girl (1936) - Cellette
 Forty Naughty Girls (1937) - Woman Watching Piper Enter Theater (uncredited)
 Miss Polly (1941) - Woman at Civic League Meeting (uncredited)
 A Date with the Falcon (1942) - Girl On Plane (uncredited)
 So's Your Aunt Emma (1942) - Zelda
 The Corpse Vanishes (1942) - Countess Lorenz
 Cat People (1942) - The Cat Woman (uncredited)
 The McGuerins from Brooklyn (1942) - Jealous Woman (uncredited)
 Stand by for Action (1942) - Expectant Mother (uncredited)
 She Has What It Takes (1943) - Chorus Girl (uncredited)
 Hitler's Madman (1943) - Maria Bartonek - Anton's Wife
 The Seventh Victim (1943) - Mimi (uncredited)
 A Scream in the Dark (1943) - Muriel
 The Uninvited (1944) - The Ghost of Mary Meredith (uncredited)
 Weird Woman (1944) - Evelyn Sawtelle
 The Curse of the Cat People (1944) - Barbara Farren
 Summer Storm (1944) - Dinner Guest Offended by Kuzma (uncredited)
 Youth Runs Wild (1944) - Mabel Taylor
 Keep Your Powder Dry (1945) - WAC Sergeant (uncredited)
 Our Vines Have Tender Grapes (1945) - Kola Hanson
 Adventure (1945) - Dame #1 (uncredited)
 Bedlam (1946) - Mistress Sims
 Wild Stallion (1952) - Dan's School Teacher (uncredited)
 Feudin' Fools (1952) - Ma Smith (uncredited)
 So Big (1953) - Elsie (uncredited)
 From the Terrace (1960) - Frolick's Woman (uncredited) (final film role)

References

External links

1916 births
2002 deaths
American film actresses
Actresses from Philadelphia
20th-century American actresses